The mixed team compound open event was one of three team events held in archery at the 2016 Summer Paralympics in Rio de Janeiro. It contained ten teams of one man and one woman, and took place on Monday 12 September 2016, the ranking round having been held on September 10. Following the restructure of the Paralympic archery events, this was the first time the event would take place.

Following a ranking round, the teams ranked 7th to 10th entered the knockout rounds at the first round stages, with the six highest seeded teams entering in the quarter final round. The losing semifinalists played off for the bronze medal.

Team compound open

Ranking round

Competition bracket

References 

M